El muro del silencio ("The Wall of Silence") is a 1974 Mexican film starring Brontis Jodorowsky as Daniel. It was directed by Luis Alcoriza. The film was shot 1972 in Bogotá and Santa Marta, Magdalena, Colombia, and released 31 January 1974. In 1973, the film music secured José Antonio Alcaraz and Rubén Fuentes the Silver Ariel for the best score (Ariel a Mejor Música de Fondo).

External links
 

1974 films
Mexican drama films
1970s Spanish-language films
Films directed by Luis Alcoriza
1970s Mexican films